Bocchoris insulalis is a moth of the family Crambidae. It can be found in Papua New Guinea on Fergusson Island.

References

Moths described in 1912
Spilomelinae